45 is an album recorded by Mexican alternative rock band Jaguares.

The album was created by Saúl Hernández and Alfonso André in collaboration with Howard Willing. Recorded in Los Angeles and Mexico in June and produced in Nashville by Dave Thoenes. "Entre Tus Jardines", is the first single released.

Trivia
The album's title, "45", refers to the approximately 45 million of people in Mexico who live in poverty. It is almost half of the country's population.

Track listing

Jaguares members credited in 45
 Saúl Hernández (lead voice and rhythm guitar)
 Alfonso André (drums, programming and sequences)
 Cesar "El Vampiro" López (lead guitar)
 Marco Rentería (bass guitar)
 Diego Herrera ( keyboards )

Sales and certifications

References 

2008 albums
Jaguares (band) albums
Alternative rock albums by Mexican artists
Grammy Award for Best Latin Rock, Urban or Alternative Album
Latin Grammy Award for Best Rock Album by a Duo or Group with Vocal